{{DISPLAYTITLE:C26H34O3}}
The molecular formula C26H34O3 (molar mass: 394.546  g/mol) may refer to:

 Androstanolone benzoate
 Levonorgestrel cyclobutylcarboxylate

Molecular formulas